The Midland Theatre is a 1,800-seat theatre that was built in 1928 in the Newark Downtown Historic District of Newark, Ohio, United States.  Since 2000, it has been used as a performance venue for live music and other performing arts events.

History
After opening its doors on December 20, 1928, the Midland Theatre served the community of Newark, Ohio, for 50 years primarily as a movie theater, until it closed in 1978.  The theatre then reopened briefly as a pornography theater complete with private viewing booths until it was closed due to unfavorable public outcry.  In need of repairs, it was purchased by Dave Longaberger and The Longaberger Company in 1992, and after an 8-year, $8.5 million renovation, the Midland opened again in 2000.

Longaberger entrusted the property to The Newark Midland Theatre Association, a local volunteer, non-profit organization.  It is also supported by the Ohio Arts Council.

Today, various musical performances by nationally known performers are held at the theater.

References

External links
Official website

Theatres in Ohio
Movie palaces
Music venues in Ohio
Theatres completed in 1928
Newark, Ohio
Buildings and structures in Licking County, Ohio
1928 establishments in Ohio
Cinemas and movie theaters in Ohio